Lumicel Animation Studios, also known as Lumicel Studios, or simply as Lumicel, is an international animation studio and entertainment company. Lumicel is known for films and animated series made using 2D animation techniques. Studio is developing original children's animation content and series such as Hana Dreams, Tak Ku T Island, Bubly, Utopia Gardens etc.

Lumicel acts as both executive producer and line producer of the programs it develops and also co-produces content with other partners. Lumicel is a fully integrated animation studio that ensures development, funding, production, marketing, and commercialization. 

Lumicel is known for creating visual animation content for well known Australian music band Piperlain, ,John Paul Vaathil Thurakkunnu, 2D animation series such as Sweet Little Monsters, Atchoo!, Eena Meena Deeka (TV series), Astra Force, Tik Tak Tail, Polar Adventure, Hazar, OPS – What an hOPSrible pack!, Berry Bees, Sweet Little Monsters etc,  Luna Agonia  feature film animation and Eider short-film animation.

Filmography
Upcoming original television series

Television Animation Series Productions

Feature Animation Production

References

Animation studios
Indian animation studios
Companies based in Thiruvananthapuram
2009 establishments in Kerala